The 2019–20 Euroleague Basketball Next Generation Tournament, also called Adidas Next Generation Tournament by sponsorship reasons, was the 18th edition of the international junior basketball tournament organized by the Euroleague Basketball.

Teams
As in past years, 32 under-18 teams from 14 countries joined the first stage, which played in four qualifying tournaments between December 2019 and February 2020.

Qualifying tournaments

Valencia, Spain

27–29 December 2019

The first qualifying tournament featured Valencia Basket, 2016 ANGT champion Barcelona, Herbalife Gran Canaria and Unicaja, all from Spain,  LDLC ASVEL from France, Cibona from Croatia, Olympiacos from Greece and Tofaş from Turkey. Herbalife Gran Canaria defeated Unicaja 88–72 in the final and advanced to the Final tournament.

Group A

Group B

7th place game

5th place game

3rd place game

Final

Final ranking

Munich, Germany

17–19 January 2020

The second qualifying tournament featured reigning ANGT champion Real Madrid from Spain, ALBA Berlin, Bayern Munich, Porsche Ludwigsburg and ratiopharm Ulm, all from Germany, three-time ANGT champion CSKA Moscow from Russia, Stellazzurra Rome from Italy and Promitheas Patras from Greece. Real Madrid defeated Stellazzurra 104–88 in the final and advanced to the Final tournament for a seventh straight year.

Group A

Group B

7th place game

5th place game

3rd place game

Final

Final ranking

Kaunas, Lithuania

7–9 February 2020

The third qualifying tournament featured twice ANGT champions Žalgiris and Rytas, both from Lithuania, 2013 ANGT champion Joventut Badalona and Casademont Zaragoza, both from Spain, Fenerbahce Beko from Turkey, Nanterre 92 from France, Umana Reyer Venice from Italy and for the first time Barking Abbey London from England. Rytas defeated Žalgiris 84–63 in the final and advanced to the Final tournament.

Group A

Group B

7th place game

5th place game

3rd place game

Final

Final ranking

Belgrade, Serbia

21–23 February 2020

The fourth qualifying tournament was featured 2014 ANGT champion Crvena zvezda mts plus fellow Serbian sides Mega Bemax and Partizan NIS, two-time ANGT champion CFBB Paris from France, Cedevita Olimpija from Slovenia, Asseco Arka Gdynia from Poland, Maccabi Tel Aviv from Israel and Panathinaikos OPAP from Greece. Traditionally, the tournament in Belgrade organizes a slam dunk and 3 points shootout contest before the final. Partizan NIS defeated CFBB Paris 79–67 in the final and advanced to the Final tournament.

Group A

Group B

7th place game

5th place game

3rd place game

Final

Final ranking

Final tournament

Cologne, Germany
21–24 May 2020

Qualified teams 
  Herbalife Gran Canaria
  Real Madrid
  Rytas
  Partizan NIS

References

External links
Official website

Euroleague Basketball Next Generation Tournament
Next Generation Tournament